Bologna San Vitale is a railway station in Bologna, Italy. The station opened in 2013 and is located on the Bologna–Ancona and Bologna–Florence lines. The train services are operated by Trenitalia Tper.

The station is managed by Rete Ferroviaria Italiana (RFI), a subsidiary of Ferrovie dello Stato Italiane (FSI), Italy's state-owned rail company.

Location
Bologna San Vitale railway station is situated east of the city centre, in the San Donato-San Vitale borough.

History
The station was formally opened on 15 December 2013. Commercial service on the Bologna-Ancona line started on 14 September 2014, while services on the Bologna–Florence line began on 13 December 2015.

Features
The station does not feature any building.

It consists of four tracks.

Train services

The station is served by the following service(s):

 Suburban services (Treno suburbano) on line S1B, Bologna - San Benedetto Val di Sambro
 Suburban services (Treno suburbano) on line S4B, Bologna - Imola

See also

 List of railway stations in Bologna
 List of railway stations in Emilia-Romagna
 Bologna metropolitan railway service

References 

Railway stations in Bologna
Railway stations opened in 2013